Pope Mountain is a largely ice-free mountain (1,345 m) rising directly at the head of Tomilin Glacier, 3 nautical miles (6 km) southeast of Governor Mountain, in the Wilson Hills. Mapped by United States Geological Survey (USGS) from surveys and U.S. Navy air photos, 1960–63. Named by Advisory Committee on Antarctic Names (US-ACAN) for Lieutenant Thomas J. Pope, U.S. Navy Reserve, Navigator in LC-130F Hercules aircraft during Operation Deep Freeze, 1968.

Mountains of Oates Land